Yataity is one of the districts of the Guairá Department, Paraguay. This district is considered the capital of the ao po'i.

Characteristics 
It is considered as a little and peaceful city with its big houses with straw roofs and ancestral streets. It is known specially for its most notable craftsmanship: the ao po'i, a fine cloth made in cotton that could be seen in shirts, dresses, blouses, sheets and others. Hundreds of artisans of Yataity get ready for the "Typical Vestments Market" made in the central square every November.

The annual expo of ao po'i is a chance for the artisans of the zone to show their creativity. This pieces shows up their fine finishing and high quality. It is estimated that around 2,200 people dedicate to the manufacture of ao po'i in this district, making of it a source of employment. Most of the specialized artisans are from Yataity, where thanks to the support of private companies, they could combine tradition and modernity for a trade of shirts that reunites the required quality standards for export. 

The ao po'i is made by hand in a 100% cotton fabric that appeared in the 18th century due to the commercial lockout imposed by Gaspar Rodríguez de Francia. The women had to manually tailor the cotton to make the vestments. "We know that the production of ao po'i has extended to other places of the country, but we can assure that the best clothes made in ao po'i are from the artisans of Yataity" says the inhabitants of the district.

Toponimy 
Its name is a Guaraní word meaning "the place of the plantation of yata'i" (Yata'i is a palm-like tree).

History 
The founding of Yataity is attributed to the Captain Bartolomé Oviedo, who in 1809 bought the property.

Besides the ao po'i, the inhabitants dedicate also to the stock-breeding of cows, to the cultivation of sugar-cane and to the exploitation of wood.

This district remains a quiet place with an image very common in the Paraguayan traditions. More than 50% of the population dedicates to the manufacture of cloths aided by primitive looms and skillful hands.

Area 
This district occupies an area of 111 square kilometers, with a total population of 4,138 inhabitants and a population density of 37.27 inhabitants per square kilometer.

Limits 
 North: The Caaguazú Department.
 South: The city of Villarrica.
 West: The Félix Pérez Cardozo district.
 East: The Doctor Botrell and Mbocayaty districts.

Hydrography 
Through this river flows the Tebicuary-mí river and the following streams:
 Mitay.
 Doña Gervasia.

Demography 
The main social-demographic indicators in the district says:
 
 Population under 15 years old: 31.1%
 Average kids per woman: 2.7 kids
 Percentage of illiterates: 7.6%

22.9% of the population dedicates to the primary sector, 53.3% to the secondary sector and 22.7% to the tertiary sector.

 Percentage of the population occupied in agricultural activities: 22.8%
 Percentage of houses with electricity service: 95.0%
 Percentage of houses with water service: 36.8%
 
Population with unsatisfied basic needs in:
 Education: 6.2%
 Sanitary infrastructure: 22.6%
 Housing quality: 30.1%
 Subsistence capacity: 6.3%

Economy 
The agricultural and cattle productions are of subsistence.

Most of the economy of this district is up to the tailoring of ao po'i vestments. 50% of the total population works on it and almost nobody in the district isn't, even indirectly, related with an ao po'i artisan.

The familiar economy is based exclusively in the labor of the artisans, and just a 10% has another job such as agriculture and stock-breeding, among other minor commercial activities.

Roads and communication 
This district seems frozen in time, with its old big houses and its peaceful streets still transited by chariots and riders on horseback.

The internal roads are terraced making easier the intercommunication between the districts

Has the telephonic services from Copaco and mobile telephony, besides various communication media and the journals from the capital of the country.

Transportation 
The district have modern buses to travel to the capital of the country and to the other departments. To the internal trips have buses of less capacity. Also can be seen chariots and riders on horseback.

How to get there 
Following the Route 2 "Mariscal José Félix Estigarribia" from Asunción, getting to the city of Coronel Oviedo and taking the Route 8 "Doctor Blas Garay" until the city of Villarrica. A sign on the road indicates an asphalted branch that gets you to Yataity.

Population 
According to the data provided by the General Office of Statistics, Polls and Census, this is the data of the Yataity district:

The total population is 4,138 inhabitants, being 2,040 males and 2,099 females.
 Population from 0 to 14 years old: 31.1%
 Population from 15 to 64 years old: 59.1%
 Population from 65 years old: 9.8%
Being 53,75% of the population settled in the rural zone.

Tourism 
The Ao Po'i Market is one of the most awaited events in this district. Other attractive is the permanent markets that the artisans make.

Its colonial look, ancient houses, tree-populated streets, beautiful squares, exquisite craftsmanship, hospitality of its people and preference for the Paraguayan tradition makes of Yataity an interesting alternative for the internal tourism.

Patronal celebration 
Every October 7 celebrates the patronal celebrations honoring its saint patron the Virgin of Rosario.
 
The celebration begins with the traditional novena every day at the church, also making bullfights, craftsmanship sales, a colorful amusement park and gambling.

In the night of the 6th day is organized a gala party with live musical bands. To the next day celebrates the Mass with the district's Priest, after of that begins the procession of the image of the Virgin for the streets of the district. After the procession there's gambling and riding with a barbecue, finishing the activities in the afternoon with more bullfights.

References 
 Tiempos del mundo
 Geografía del Paraguay
 Che Retá Paraguay
 Datos del la DGEEC
 ABC Color
 Ultima Hora

External links 
Secretaria Nacional de Turismo
World Gazeteer: Paraguay – World-Gazetteer.com

Populated places in the Guairá Department